Peter Matheson may refer to:

Peter Matheson, character in List of Person of Interest episodes
Peter Matheson (animator) on Anastasia (1997 film)

See also
Peter Mathieson (disambiguation)